Marek Karbarz (born 22 July 1950) is a Polish former volleyball player and coach, a member of the Poland national team from 1969 to 1979. He is the 1976 Olympic Champion and the 1974 World Champion.

Honours

Clubs
 CEV European Champions Cup 
  1972/1973 – with Resovia
 National championships
 1970/1971  Polish Championship, with Resovia
 1971/1972  Polish Championship, with Resovia
 1973/1974  Polish Championship, with Resovia
 1974/1975  Polish Cup, with Resovia
 1974/1975  Polish Championship, with Resovia

External links
 
 
 Player profile at Volleybox.net

1950 births
Living people
People from Tarnów County
Polish men's volleyball players
Polish volleyball coaches
Olympic volleyball players of Poland
Volleyball players at the 1972 Summer Olympics
Volleyball players at the 1976 Summer Olympics
Olympic gold medalists for Poland
Olympic medalists in volleyball
Medalists at the 1976 Summer Olympics
Polish expatriate sportspeople in France
Expatriate volleyball players in France
Resovia (volleyball) players
Resovia (volleyball) coaches